Kentucky Route 2048 (KY 2048) is a north–south state highway extending  across eastern Louisville, Kentucky. The southern terminus of the route is at Kentucky Route 155 (Taylorsville Road) adjacent to Bowman Field. The northern terminus is at  U.S. Route 60 (Frankfort Avenue). KY 2048 is named Dutchmans Lane from KY 155 to Cannons Lane, and Cannons Lane from Dutchmans Lane to US 60. The route has an interchange with Interstate 64 along its Cannons Lane segment.

Route description
KY 2048 begins at an intersection with KY 155 in Louisville, heading northeast on four-lane undivided Dutchmans Lane. The road passes between Bowman Field airport to the northwest and homes and businesses to the southeast. The route turns northwest onto Cannons Lane and continues in between the airport to the southwest and Big Spring Country Club to the northeast. KY 2048 becomes a divided highway and reaches an interchange with I-64, curving to the north. Past this interchange, the road becomes two lanes and undivided as it passes through wooded residential neighborhoods. The route heads to the northwest again and comes to an intersection with US 60 Alt. KY 2048 continues to its northern terminus at a junction with US 60.

Major intersections

See also
Roads in Louisville, Kentucky

References

2048
2048
Transportation in Jefferson County, Kentucky